Kevin J. Manning, Ph.D. (born November 8, 1944 in New York, New York) is the former president of Stevenson University, the former Villa Julie College and the third largest independent university in Maryland. He was inaugurated as the fourth president of Villa Julie College on October 28, 2000, succeeding Carolyn Manuszak. He resigned from Stevenson University on November 29, 2016.

Academic career

Manning has more than 40 years of experience in higher education administration. A graduate of Webster University in St. Louis, Missouri (1967), Manning earned his M.S. in Counseling and Student Personnel from Shippensburg University (1976) and his Ph.D. in Higher Education Administration from The Ohio State University (1982). He is a graduate of Harvard University’s Institute for Educational Management (1989) and in 2006 was an invited participant at the Oxford Round Table, University of Oxford, England. Prior to his service at Stevenson, Manning held key administrative positions at Washington University in St. Louis, Missouri; Elizabethtown College in Elizabethtown, Pennsylvania; and Immaculata University in Malvern, Pennsylvania.

Stevenson presidency

Manning has overseen 15 years of institutional growth and transformation for Stevenson University. After assuming the presidency of Villa Julie College in 2000, he took steps to establish a strategic plan for the institution, instituted its first faculty governance plan, developed its first formal capital campaign strategy, and enhanced its reputation through marketing and public relations. He also expanded its Board of Trustees and established the college's first President's Advisory Council. He led the institution through its transition to university status and its name change to Stevenson University in June 2008.

In December 2011, the Chronicle of Higher Education listed Manning among the highest-paid college presidents in the country based on his 2009 salary of $1,493,655, although nearly two-thirds of the salary was a one-time deferred compensation payment accumulated during his first nine years as president of Stevenson. Manning's salary that year represented almost 2 percent of Stevenson's budget and was 16.1 times the university's average faculty salary of $92,500.

Manning has spent his career focused on what constitutes effective learning. He has spoken and written frequently about the effectiveness of education for career preparation and on the use of theory, practice, and mentoring as effective forms of training. In 2001, he introduced to Stevenson the concept of Career Architecture, a process to help address the skills and tools students will need to determine their individual strengths and interests for the best potential for career success.  Manning encouraged the development of study abroad, experiential learning, and service learning at Stevenson.

In 2004, Manning established the institution's second campus in Owings Mills, Maryland, a move critical to transitioning the former commuter college into a residential university. Manning has focused on growing the 100-plus acre Owings Mills campus by adding additional residences, a student community center, a dining and student center, the Brown School of Business and Leadership, the Caves Sports and Wellness Center, a Gymnasium, and Mustang Stadium to host the university's field sports. In 2009, he announced that Stevenson would be adding football to its roster of NCAA Division III sports programs. In November 2011, Manning oversaw the purchase of the Shire Plc property in Owings Mills, Maryland, which increased the Owings Mills campus by 29 acres of land and 170,000 square feet of laboratory, classroom, and office space.

In addition to facilities, Manning has focused on adding undergraduate academic programs that enhance the university's career-focused mission as well as expanding Stevenson's School of Graduate and Professional Studies, which offers onsite and online bachelor's and master's degrees in areas such as nursing, healthcare management, cyber forensics, forensic studies, forensic science, criminal justice, business and technology management, and paralegal studies. In March 2009, Manning approved a university restructuring plan for the formal creation of the university's six schools led by deans: the Brown School of Business and leadership; the School of Design; the School of Education; the School of Humanities and Social Sciences; the School of the Sciences; and the School of Graduate and Professional Studies.

Manning's presidency has played a pivotal role in building Stevenson University's reputation as a national leader in career education. U.S. News & World Report’s America’s Best Colleges ranking named Stevenson a “Best Value” college in 2005. Stevenson was named one of the nation's “Up-and-Coming Schools” in the 2012 edition of America's Best Colleges.

Awards and public service

Manning was recognized as a Maryland Innovator of the Year by The Daily Record in September 2003 for the creation of Stevenson's Career Architecture approach to undergraduate education. In 2007, he received the Ernst & Young Entrepreneur of The Year Award in the education category in Maryland. In 2010, Manning contributed the whitepaper “Doing More with Less: Transforming a Program through Technology” to President to President: Views on Technology in Higher Education, Volume II published by SunGard Higher Education and the Council of Independent Colleges (CIC); and “Leadership and Change” to Presidential Perspectives: Economic Prosperity in the Next Decade, 2010/2011 published by Aramark.

In addition to his role as president, Manning has served on numerous education, business, and civic boards including the Council for Independent Colleges Presidential Forum Group; Greater Baltimore Committee Board of Directors; Independent College Fund of Maryland Board of Trustees; Maryland Business Roundtable for Education Board of Directors; Maryland Chamber of Commerce Board of Directors; and the Maryland Independent College and University Association Executive Committee, Budget Committee, Capital Projects Committee, Executive Committee, and Task Force on Public Policy (Chair, 2002–2003). He also served as Co-Chair of the United Way of Central Maryland's 2009 Campaign.

In February 2011, Manning was appointed to the Board of Directors of the National Association of Independent Colleges and Universities (NAICU), representing NAICU Region II member institutions from Maryland, Delaware, the District of Columbia, New Jersey, and New York. He was also named an "Influential Marylander" three times by the editorial board of the Daily Record (Maryland) business and legal newspaper, and was admitted to the paper's "Circle of Influence" award winners in March 2015. In June 2012, Manning was appointed by Maryland Governor Martin O'Malley to the Governor's P-20 Leadership Council of Maryland. In 2013, he was appointed chair of the Maryland Independent College and University Association.

References

1944 births
Living people
Heads of universities and colleges in the United States
Elizabethtown College people
Harvard University alumni
Immaculata University people
Ohio State University College of Education and Human Ecology alumni
Shippensburg University of Pennsylvania alumni
Stevenson University
Washington University in St. Louis faculty
Webster University alumni